is a Japanese manga series by Sakuya Amano. Originally published in Ichijinsha's yuri manga magazine Comic Yuri Hime S under the name  between 2009 and 2010 before going on hiatus, the series relaunched in Gentosha's seinen manga magazine Comic Birz in December 2014. The manga is licensed in English by Tokyopop. A 12-episode anime television series adaptation by Lerche aired in Japan between October and December 2017.

Characters

An innocent and loving foxgirl who has grown up with a nun, and just arrived at Konohanatei to expand her horizons. She has great respect for everyone around her, but takes a particular liking to Satsuki. A healing character, she brightens up the visitors' days.

 
A serious-minded foxgirl and a bit of a workaholic. Deep down, she is quite sensitive, hoping to become a miko someday. Nevertheless, this only makes her work harder at Konohanatei to make up for her feelings of incompetence. She is quite fond of Yuzu, but not very good at showing it.

 
A tomboyish foxgirl that would easily pass as male. She has an exuberant and playful personality, but can be quite dedicated and courageous at times. She is quite protective of Ren, but gets along with everyone else.

 
A feminine and perfectionistic foxgirl who seeks solace in being beautiful and performing well in her work. She is afraid of men due to childhood traumas of being bullied by them, but seems to see Natsume as her 'boyfriend' figure.

 
A tiny foxgirl who is mysterious and idiosyncratic. Her thoughts are seldom known and she always seems to be doing weird, genius-like things. She spends some time with Yuzu since they're both the smallest, but secretly seems to trust Kiri the most.

A relaxed, older foxgirl who is the head of all the others. She appears to be laid-back but has an emotionally-intelligent side, seeming to have much experience in dealing with others and is secretly fond of Sakura and acts as her caretaker.

A "cursed" porcelain doll who ends up joining the Konohanatei after she is brought in for purification. She is often pestered by Sakura, who wants to cut her hair. She also mentions many times that her real name is not Okiku, but she has also never revealed her actual name.

The owner of Konohanatei who has the appearance of a fox but can look human by applying makeup.

Media

Manga
Sakuya Amano's original manga was first serialized in Ichijinsha's Comic Yuri Hime S yuri magazine in 2009 under the name Konohana-tei Kitan, before going on hiatus in 2010. Ichijinsha compiled the series into two tankōbon volumes released between February and September 2010, with new editions published by Gentosha between May and June 2015. In December 2014, the series relaunched as Konohana Kitan in Gentosha's Comic Birz magazine. Thirteen tankōbon volumes have been released as of December 2021. Tokyopop began publishing the series in North America from July 24, 2018.

Volume list
Konohana-tei Kitan

Konohana Kitan

Anime
A 12-episode anime television series adaptation, directed by Hideki Okamoto at Lerche with Takao Yoshioka handled the series composition and Keiko Kurosawa designed the characters, aired in Japan between October 4 and December 20, 2017. Crunchyroll simulcast the series while Funimation streamed a simuldub.

Episode list

Notes

References

External links
 

2017 anime television series debuts
Crunchyroll anime
Fantasy anime and manga
Funimation
Gentosha manga
Ichijinsha manga
Japanese mythology in anime and manga
Lerche (studio)
Seinen manga
Shōnen manga
Slice of life anime and manga
Tokyopop titles